Cardita distorta, or the dog's foot cockle, is a bivalve mollusc of the family Carditidae, endemic to New Zealand including the Chatham Islands and southern offshore islands. It is found from low tide to depths of approximately 185 m.

References
 Powell A. W. B., New Zealand Mollusca, William Collins Publishers Ltd, Auckland, New Zealand 1979 
 Glen Pownall, New Zealand Shells and Shellfish, Seven Seas Publishing Pty Ltd, Wellington, New Zealand 1979 

Carditidae
Bivalves of New Zealand
Taxa named by Harold John Finlay